Patrice Pike (born August 4, 1970) is an American singer, songwriter, and musician.

Sita KC 
Patrice grew up in Dallas, Texas, playing ukulele and violin. When she was 15, she began attending the Booker T. Washington High School for the Performing and Visual Arts (aka the "Arts Magnet"). Former attendees of the school include Edie Brickell, Norah Jones and Zac Baird; among Patrice's classmates was Roy Hargrove.

After graduating from Booker T. Washington, Pike attended the University of North Texas. She founded the band Little Sister in 1991 with Wayne Sutton.

Career

Little Sister 
Pike founded Little Sister with Wayne Sutton in 1991. During this time, they played the Black Cat as an opening band for Soul Hat, as well as headlining themselves. The band was invited to tour on the H.O.R.D.E. tour with Blues Traveler, Dave Matthews Band, and Allman Brothers Band and recorded their first major label record, Free Love And Nickel Beer, on EMI/SBK records just prior to the tour.

Sister 7 

Due to naming conflicts over the name Little Sister, particularly by a band in Boston and in the midst of being signed by Arista Records, the band name was changed to Sister 7. Pike is known as front woman for this seminal Austin jam band, which she co-founded soon after attending of The High School for the performing and visual arts at Booker T. Washington in Dallas, Texas.

Their first major label album was a live recording. Patrice wrote and sang Sister 7's top 10 Billboard hit "Know What You Mean". She was the USA Songwriting Competition Grand Prize Winner overall for the song "My Three Wishes", co-written with her Sister 7 band members. In this contest she also garnered top prize for Pop category for "Nobody Knows", written with songwriter/producer John Shanks. Just after the making of their release "Wrestling Over Tiny Matters", Arista Records' executive staff imploded. The band lost its label affiliation in the much publicized Arista shakeup that culminated in the firing of music industry legend Clive Davis. Just after departing the label, they recorded Sister 7 Live and released a DVD, Three Times Live, recorded in three legendary venues including Antones, Steamboat and La Zona Rosa.

2000–present 
Over the past decade, she has independently released several studio releases, including Flat 13 EP, Fencing Under Fire, and Unraveling, and has released two live records – Live AT The Brushwood Lounge Volume 1 with Wayne Sutton and Live and Then Some! Brushwood Volume 2. She has toured as a solo artist since Sister 7 stopped touring both in the U.S. and overseas. She has co-created numerous records and musical groups, including her band the Black Box Rebellion and toured all over the United States and Western Europe. Patrice has been recently inducted into the Austin/Texas Music Hall of Fame when she also won Musician of the Year, Best Female Vocalist, and Song of the year in Austin for her song "Beautiful Thing", which she debuted on the CBS primetime television series Rock Star. She has performed in tours and festivals including Lilith Fair and H.O.R.D.E. tour to music festival institutions like Austin City Limits, High Sierra, Strawberry, and Kerrville festivals.  In 2009, 2010, 2012 and 2013, she has also appeared as a Special Guest Artist with the Grammy-nominated choral group Conspirare. Patrice has been known to participate regularly in social and environmental activism and she is also the co-founder and acting executive director of The Step Onward Foundation, an organization that provides services for young adult survivors of homelessness. Patrice's latest album, The Calling, was released in June 2013;
In 2017 Patrice, with music partner Wayne Sutton founded a new project Pike and Sutton, co-writing a new record Heart Is A Compass, containing 11 songs. The record was mastered in 2019 and is scheduled for release in January 2020. This is the first music co-written and produced by Patrice Pike and Wayne Sutton since the last Arista release Wrestling Over Tiny Matters.

Footnotes
Bands to Watch: Patrice Pike, Austin Monthly
The Calling review, Austin Chronicle
Pike & Sutton Look to a Better Future With ‘Together’: Premiere, Billboard
How one "Grace" inspired a movement: Singer's chance encounter gets homeless teens off the streets, Culture Map Houston
Patrice Pike biography, AllMusic

References

External links 
 Official website

Living people
Musicians from Dallas
American rock singers
American rock guitarists
Bisexual singers
Bisexual songwriters
Bisexual women
American LGBT singers
American LGBT songwriters
Women rock singers
1970 births
Guitarists from Texas
21st-century American women singers
21st-century American women guitarists